Gypsy Corner is the junction of the A40 road with the A4000 road (Horn Lane) in North Acton, West London.

The name originates from the Irish Travellers (sometimes referred to as gypsies), who would travel along this main road in and out of London and camp near to the road here.  An official caravan site is still maintained by the local council a few hundred metres north by North Acton station.

It takes the form of a broad gyratory, crossed by the arterial road.

References

Road junctions in London